Daoura (Aakkar)   (also Daouret) is a  town in Akkar Governorate, Lebanon.

The population of Daouret  is  Sunni Muslim, Greek Orthodox and Maronite.

History
In 1838, Eli Smith noted  the village as ed-Durah, located east of esh-Sheikh Mohammed. The residents were Sunni Muslims.

References

Bibliography

External links
Daoura (Aakkar), Localiban 

Populated places in Akkar District
Sunni Muslim communities in Lebanon
Eastern Orthodox Christian communities in Lebanon
Maronite Christian communities in Lebanon